Louis René Quentin de Richebourg, marquis de Champcenetz (1723-1813), was a French official. He was governor of the Tuileries Palace at the time of the French Revolution.  

He was married three times: the third time with Albertine-Elisabeth Pater. He was the father of his namesake, the journalist Louis René Quentin de Richebourg de Champcenetz.  

He was the personal enemy of the Duc d'Orleans Louis Philippe, who nevertheless enabled him to save his life on the request of Grace Elliott.

References 

French marquesses
1723 births
1813 deaths
People of the French Revolution